Lavar Scott (born September 6, 2003) is an American professional stock car racing driver who competes full-time in the ARCA Menards Series East, driving the No. 6 Chevrolet SS for Rev Racing as well as part-time in the ARCA Menards Series, driving the Nos. 2 and 6 Chevrolet SS's for Rev Racing. He is also a current member of NASCAR's Drive for Diversity program.

Racing career

Early career
Scott started racing at age five in quarter midget racing cars at Airport Speedway in New Castle, Delaware (near his hometown of Carneys Point Township) alongside his older brother. After that, he would start competing in dirt racing events. At Penns Grove High School, he competed in wrestling.

In 2021 and 2022, Scott drove for Rev Racing in legends car racing and late model racing at tracks such as Hickory Motor Speedway. He won his first late model race in 2021 at Hickory. He competed in two FB Bhon Mikel's Truck Series races in Mexico in 2021 (alongside his Rev Racing/Drive for Diversity teammate Regina Sirvent) and won one of those races.

ARCA
On January 13, 2023, it was announced that Scott would drive full-time in the ARCA Menards Series East and part-time in the main ARCA Menards Series (as a result of the East Series having four combination races with the East Series) in 2023, driving the No. 6 car for Rev Racing. He would also compete in one non-combination main ARCA race in the season-opener at Daytona, replacing Andrés Pérez de Lara in Rev's No. 2 car due to Pérez de Lara, the full-time driver of that car, still being 17 and therefore ineligible to run the race.

Personal life
Scott is from Carney's Point, New Jersey. His mother was a drag racing driver and obtained a license to drive in the NHRA and his grandfather also raced cars. His older brother raced in quarter midget racing events at nearby Airport Speedway in nearby New Castle, Delaware at a young age. He has been inspired by fellow African-American NASCAR driver Bubba Wallace, Kyle Larson, who started his career racing on dirt tracks and for Rev Racing/in the Drive for Diversity program like Scott, and Steve Park, who competed in local short track races in the Northeastern United States early in his career like Scott. In addition, Scott is close friends with fellow NASCAR driver Rajah Caruth. The two of them, both African-Americans, were part of NASCAR's Drive for Diversity program for Rev Racing together.

Scott graduated from Penns Grove High School in 2021 and was on the school's wrestling team and outdoor track teams according to NJ.com.

Motorsports career results

ARCA Menards Series
(key) (Bold – Pole position awarded by qualifying time. Italics – Pole position earned by points standings or practice time. * – Most laps led.)

ARCA Menards Series East

 Season still in progress

References

External links
 

2003 births
Living people
NASCAR drivers
ARCA Menards Series drivers
Penns Grove High School alumni
People from Carneys Point Township, New Jersey
Racing drivers from New Jersey
Sportspeople from Salem County, New Jersey
21st-century African-American sportspeople